The 2018 Saudi-Egyptian Super Cup is the 3rd Saudi-Egyptian Super Cup, a football match played between the title holders of the domestic league and cup in both countries. The Egyptian Premier League winners will play against the King Cup winners, and the Saudi Professional League winners will play against the Egypt Cup winners.

Participating teams

Matches

President Abdel Fattah el-Sisi's Super Cup

King Salman's Super Cup

References

Saudi-Egyptian Super Cup Seasons
Saudi-Egyptian Super Cup
Saudi-Egyptian Super Cup